Alifa (Bengali: আলিফা) is an Indian Bengali drama feature film written and directed by Deep Choudhury and produced by Arman Ahmed. It stars Baharul Islam and Jaya Seal.

Alifa won the Best Debut Film of A Director award to Deep Choudhury in 2017 64th National Film Awards.

Story
This movie carries the story of a couple and their daughter Alifa as they had lost their home for soil erosion by the Beki River at Barpeta and settled in Guwahati for their livelihood.[]

Cast 
 Baharul Islam
 Jaya Seal
 Victor Banerjee 
 Al-Mamun Al Siyam as Saif
 Prasun Gayen
 Satya Ranjan
 Pakija Hasmi
 Rayan Abdul
 Swapna Dey
 Mahmuda Begum
 Tajmal Hussain
 Pabitra Rabha as Ranjan

Festivals
Alifa premièred at 22nd Kolkata International Film Festival in at Kolkata, West Bengal in November 2016.

Alifa was also screened at Ottawa Indian Film Festival Awards 2017 at Ottawa, Canada

Reception

Critical response 
NEZine.com writes about the film as "Alifa- in search of hope and humanity amidst chaos and despair" 

Alifa was also featured in North East Today article in April, 2017

Accolades
The film was screened at 22nd Kolkata International Film Festival

Awards and nominations
 64th National Film Awards
 Best Debut Film of A Director - Deep Choudhury. Alifa (2016)

References

External links 
 

Best Debut Feature Film of a Director National Film Award winners
Bengali-language Indian films
2010s Bengali-language films